Cornelis Johannes "Kees" Ouwens (27 June 1944 in Zeist – 24 August 2004 in Heemstede) was a Dutch novelist and poet.  He won numerous awards throughout his career, among them the 2002 Constantijn Huygens Prize.

References
Profile at the Digital library for Dutch literature

1944 births
2004 deaths
Dutch male novelists
Dutch male poets
People from Zeist
Constantijn Huygens Prize winners
20th-century Dutch poets
20th-century Dutch male writers
20th-century Dutch novelists